Wren-Lewis is an English surname. Notable people with the surname include:

 John Wren-Lewis (1923–2006), British psychologist, scientist, and professor
 Simon Wren-Lewis (born 1953), British economist and professor

Compound surnames
English-language surnames